Arnaud Devillers, F.S.S.P., is a French Roman Catholic priest. He was the Superior General of the Priestly Fraternity of Saint Peter between 2000 and 2006. Controversially, he was not elected by members of the Fraternity, but was appointed directly by the president of the Ecclesia Dei commission, Cardinal Darío Castrillón Hoyos. The background to his appointment was an argument within the ranks of the Fraternity as to whether they should concelebrate the Mass of Paul VI. Devillers was seen to be a neutral candidate who was not strongly in favour of either side of the argument. He was the second Superior General after Josef Bisig and was succeeded by John Berg.

References

External links
Priestly Fraternity of St. Peter - International website with pages in English, French, German, Spanish, Portuguese, Italian, Polish, and Latin
Organizational chart of FSSP leadership

Living people
20th-century French Roman Catholic priests
French traditionalist Catholics
21st-century French Roman Catholic priests
Priestly Fraternity of St. Peter
Year of birth missing (living people)